The 1970 Campeonato Argentino de Rugby  was won by the selection of Buenos Aires that beat in the final the selection of  Cordoba

That year in Argentine rugby 
 After Wales  (1968) and Scotland (1969), was Ireland to visit in tour Argentina. An interesting come-back after the 1952 tour. The "Pumas" won both the tests.

 The Buenos Aires Championship was won by C.U.B.A. and San Isidro Club
 The Cordoba Province Championship was won by Córdoba Athletic
 The North-East Championship was won by Universitario Tucuman

Knock out stages

Semifinals 

 Buenos Aires R. Spagnol,  M. Walther,  A. Travaglini,  A. Rodríguez Jurado,  M. Pascual,  C. Martínez,  L. Gradin,  N. Carbone,  H. Silva (cap.),  H. Miguens,  A. Anthony,  A. Otaño,  L. garcía Yáñez,  R. Handley,  R. Foster.
Cuyo:  J. Castro,  C. Dora,  O. Terranova,  R. Tarquini,  M. Brandi,  C. Navesi,  L. Chacón,  J. Nasazzi,  E. Casale (cap.),  J. Navesi,  C. Guiñazú,  R. Irañeta,  O. Bempo,  L. Ramos,  G. González. 

Mar del Plata: L. Pieringheli,  D. Filippa,  C. Sosa,  E. Corpacho,  G. Beverino,  R. Caparelli,  R. Lerasrio,  J. C. Etchegaray,  R. Losada,  J. Giango,  E. Mayorano,  G. Isabella,  R. García,  R. Sepa,  A. Bibbo. 
Cordoba= L. Capell,  C. Antoraz,  J. Martínez,  J. Pianillo,  H. Espinosa,  M. Olmedo Arana,  J. Vera,  D. Torrecilla,  P. Demo,  H. Barrera,  R. Campra,  R. Pasaglia,  G. Ribeca,  H. Bianchi,  C. Abud.

Third place final 

Cuyo J. Castro,  E. Gandía,  C. Lomazi,  O. Terranova,  M. Brandi,  C. Navesi,  E. Naviera,  J. Navesi,  E. Casale (cap.),  Nasazzi,  E. Sánchez,  C. Guiñazú,  O. Bempo,  L. Ramos,  C. González. 
 Mar del Plata: E. Feulliasier,  D. Filippa,  C. Sosa,  E. Corbacho,  G. Beverino,  R. Erario,  R. Caparelli,  J. c. Etchegaray,  R. Losada,  J. Gialongo,  R. García,  E. Mayorano,  L. Franul,  J. Alsina,  G. Isabella.

Final 

 Buonos Aires: R. Spagnol,  M. Walther,  A. Rodríguez Jurado,  A. Travaglini,  M. Pascual,  C. Martínez,  L. Gradin,  R. Loyola,  H. Silva (cap.),  H. Miguens,  A. Anthony,  A. Otaño,  R. Foster,  R. Handley,  L. García Yáñez
 Cordoba:' L. Capell,  D. Torrecilla,  J. Martínez,  M. Pianillo,  C. Antoraz,  M. Olmedo Arana,  J. Vera,  R. Bylleved,  P. Demo,  H. Barrera,  R. Passaglia,  J. Campra,  G. Ribeca,  H. Bianchi,  C. Abud.

Bibliography 
  Memorias de la UAR 1970
  XXVI Campeonato Argentino

Campeonato Argentino de Rugby
Argentina
Campeonato